The ZTE Open is an entry-level smartphone released by ZTE in July 2013. It is intended for software developers wanting to build and test mobile applications on Firefox OS, though it was sold commercially in Spain.

ZTE Open was launched in India in October 2013, in collaboration with eBay India (eBay.in). The device is not freely available in that the vendor requires a PayPal account.

Rooting
The phone can be rooted by exploiting a known security vulnerability,  a.k.a. Qualcomm DIAG root. This vulnerability was discovered 7 months before the ZTE Open was released. The vulnerability in question can be used to modify system files, but it cannot be used to unlock the locked bootloader.

See also
Comparison of Firefox OS devices
ZTE Open C

References

Firefox OS devices
Open-source mobile phones
Mobile phones introduced in 2013
Smartphones
ZTE mobile phones